Michel Leclercq (born 1938/39) is a French billionaire businessman. He is the founder and 40% owner of Decathlon. With over 1647 stores in 57 countries and regions (Jan 2020), it is the largest sporting goods retailer in the world.

Early life
Leclercq was born in France. His cousin, Gérard Mulliez, is the founder of the Auchan supermarket chain, and owns 40% of Decathlon.

Career
Leclercq founded Decathlon, a sporting goods retailer, in 1976.

As of December 2017, Forbes estimated his net worth at US$5.1 billion.

Personal life
He is married with four children, and lives in Lille, France.

His wife, Marie-Claude Leclercq, is a psychotherapist, and represents the family on the council of the Decathlon Foundation, started in 2005.

References

1939 births
Living people
French billionaires
French company founders
Leclercq family